The Dixie Classic was an annual college basketball tournament played from 1949 to 1960 in Reynolds Coliseum. The field consisted of the "Big Four" North Carolina schools, the host NC State Wolfpack, Duke Blue Devils, North Carolina Tar Heels, and Wake Forest Demon Deacons, and four teams from across the country.

North Carolina State head coach Everett Case originated the idea of the Classic. His assistant, Carl "Butter" Anderson provided the name. The tournament was played over a three-day period every December, just after Christmas, on  North Carolina State's home court.

The Classic consisted of three rounds. In the first round the four North Carolina schools would each play a visiting team.  The winners of the first-round game would advance in the winners' bracket and the losers would advance in the losers' bracket. Each day would have four games played until the third and final day when a champion would be crowned.  No team from outside North Carolina ever won the Classic.

The tournament came to an end after a point-shaving scandal in 1961 involving players from both North Carolina State and North Carolina. The Big Four schools later participated in the Big Four Tournament from 1971 to 1981.

Background and founding

During the 1930s and 1940s, NC State had been outperformed by Duke and North Carolina in football. The school made a decision to improve their basketball program because it was cheaper to do so. Their first move was to build a new, larger basketball venue to replace Thompson Gym. Construction started in 1941, but the United States' involvement in World War II forced the construction's cessation. NC State's then athletic council H. A. Fisher sought advice on who to hire to coach NC State from Chuck Taylor, who stated: "The best basketball coach in the country is a lieutenant commander in the U.S. Navy. His name is Everett Case." Famed Indiana high school coach Case was hired after the war ended and first demanded they redesign their in construction arena. Case wanted the venue to be very large, larger than the recently constructed Duke Indoor Stadium. As the arena had a steel frame already built, to increase capacity, they extended the building to have larger end zones behind the baskets. The 12,400 seat building was completed in 1949 and officially called William Neal Reynolds Coliseum.

As the coliseum was being finished, football in the state was immensely successful with Duke Blue Devils football coach Wallace Wade leading the Blue Devils to success, multi–position Charlie Justice at North Carolina, and Wake Forest coach Peahead Walker leading the team to bowl games. Football's regular season in 1949 came to an end on November 19, when the Tar Heels played the Blue Devils in front of a state record crowd of 57,500. Weeks later, Case had planned for a basketball tournament to be held at Reynolds Coliseum across three days, with eight participants. The tournament was a joint idea between Case and The News and Observer writer Dick Herbert. The tournament was to be called the Dixie Classic, a name created by his assistant coach Carl "Butter" Anderson. Case desired to create the Christmas holiday tournament as he felt North Carolina was ignored in national sports coverage. The tournament would feature each of the four schools referred to as the Big Four or Tobacco Road: Duke University, North Carolina State College, University of North Carolina at Chapel Hill, and Wake Forest College. The remaining four entrants would be various talented teams from across the nation. Often the invited schools would be asked close to one or two years before the year of the tournament in question. In advance of the first edition, The News and Observer speculated that the event would increase statewide interest in basketball, along with showing how other areas teams play the sport.

History

The first edition of the Dixie Classic brought Georgia Tech, Penn State, Rhode Island State College, and West Virginia, along with the Big Four.

Point–shaving scandal

As early as 1959, there were allegations of point shaving, but there was no evidence found. In 1961, an operation that was discovered involving the tournament that could be traced back to gambling in New York City. On May 14, 1961, University of North Carolina system President William C. Friday was called to an emergency meeting in Chapel Hill, North Carolina with Wake County's district solicitor Lester Chalmers. At the meeting, it was disclosed that at least four NC State players and maybe two North Carolina players were involved in fixing the matches, one game which for sure happened at the Dixie Classic. During the meeting, it was revealed that a gambler had pulled a gun on an NC State player when the fix did not go as planned. At the behest of President Friday and chancellors from both NC State and North Carolina, the Dixie Classic was cancelled after twelve years. In addition, sanctions were placed on the NC State and North Carolina basketball programs. The two teams also had reduced schedules for the 1961–62 seasons where they could play the fourteen conference games, but only two non–conference games instead of the standard nine. Other penalties included the prevention of players participating in summer basketball leagues and limiting the number of recruits from outside the Atlantic Coast Conference (ACC) territory to two. By 1962, the point shaving scandal could be traced through 50 players at 25 different schools involving at least 54 games. Four Wolfpack players and one Tar Heel were charged with bribery and then granted immunity in the Wake County Superior Court because they testified against the conspirators. In Durham County, the same players were tried and convicted, but given suspended sentences. Of the eight conspirators who paid players, six pleaded guilty in North Carolina to bribery and conspiracy before serving prison sentences, while two went to trial and were found guilty.

Year by year

* All games played at Reynolds Coliseum, Raleigh, North Carolina.

Aftermath

The event had such an impact that people put tickets to the Dixie Classic into their will. Friday stated that "There was no Final Four in those days. It was our Final Four. There was enormous pressure on the thing from top to bottom." When interviewed close to 50 years later, Friday stated that the gun being pulled on a player still bothered him.

References

Footnotes

Citations

Bibliography

External links
 
 Dixie Classic digital collection at NC State University Libraries

Recurring sporting events established in 1949
Recurring sporting events disestablished in 1960
College men's basketball competitions in the United States
Duke Blue Devils men's basketball
NC State Wolfpack men's basketball
North Carolina Tar Heels men's basketball
Wake Forest Demon Deacons men's basketball
1949 establishments in North Carolina
1960 disestablishments in North Carolina